Pre-Bird (later re-released as Mingus Revisited) is an album by jazz bassist and composer Charles Mingus consisting of music that was composed before Mingus first heard Charlie Parker, hence the title Pre-Bird. It was released on Mercury Records in September 1961.

The music is scored for various sized large jazz ensembles and features many soloists prominent at the time of recording. The album includes two tracks which are contrapuntal arrangements of two swing era pieces, whereby "Take the "A" Train" (left channel) is paired with a simultaneous "Exactly Like You" (right channel), and likewise "Do Nothin' Till You Hear From Me" with "I Let a Song Go Out of My Heart". Tracks 1 to 3, 5 and 6 recorded May 25, 1960 probably at Plaza Sound, New York City; tracks 4, 7 and 8 recorded May 24, 1960 at Plaza Sound, New York City.

Track listing
"Take the "A" Train" (Billy Strayhorn) / "Exactly Like You" (Jimmy McHugh/Dorothy Fields) – 3:40
"Prayer For Passive Resistance" – 3:57
"Eclipse" – 4:01
"Mingus Fingus No. 2" – 3:39
"Weird Nightmare" - 3:42
"Do Nothin' Till You Hear From Me" (Duke Ellington/Bob Russell) / "I Let a Song Go Out of My Heart" (Duke Ellington/Irving Mills/Henry Nemo/John Redmond) - 3:41
"Bemoanable Lady" - 4:30
"Half-Mast Inhibition" - 8:14

All compositions by Charles Mingus, except where indicated

Personnel
Max Roach - drums
Gunther Schuller - conductor
Marcus Belgrave - trumpet
Ted Curson - trumpet
Clark Terry - trumpet
Hobart Dotson - trumpet
Richard Williams - trumpet
Robert Di Domenica - flute
Harry Shulman - oboe
Eric Dolphy - alto saxophone, flute
Booker Ervin - saxophone
Yusuf Lateef - saxophone, flute
John LaPorta - saxophone
Danny Bank - saxophone
Bill Barron - saxophone
Joe Farrell - saxophone
Eddie Bert - trombone
Slide Hampton - trombone
Jimmy Knepper - trombone
Charles "Majeed" Greenlee - trombone
Paul Bley - piano
Roland Hanna - piano
Charles Mingus – bass
George Scott - drums
Dannie Richmond - drums
Sticks Evans - drums
Lorraine Cusson - vocals

References

1961 albums
Charles Mingus albums
Mercury Records albums
Limelight Records albums
Albums conducted by Gunther Schuller